Filthy Lucre is a  slang term for money. It may also refer to:


Books
 Filthy Lucre: Economics for People Who Hate Capitalism, 2009 book by Joseph Heath
 Filthy Lucre (novel), a novel by English author Beryl Bainbridge

Music
 "Filthy Lucre", a track on the 2010 album Like There's No Tomorrow by Australian band Mary Jane Kelly
 Filthy Lucre (band), a band formed by British musician Steve Dior in 1993
Filthy Lucre Live, an album by British punk rock band the Sex Pistols album
 Filthy Lucre Tour, 1996 reunion tour of the Sex Pistols
 Filthy Lucre (music producer), an Australian music production and remixing outfit headed by Gavin Campbell

Other
 Filthy Lucre, a 2014 art project by U.S. artist Darren Waterston
 "Filthy Lucre" (Californication), an episode of the television series Californication

See also
Lucre (disambiguation)